The 2015 Ivy League Baseball Championship Series was held at Robertson Field at Satow Stadium, the home field of  in New York, NY. Columbia won the series for the third consecutive year to claim the Ivy League's automatic berth in the 2015 NCAA Division I baseball tournament.

 claimed their eighth straight Rolfe Division title, while  and  tied for the Gehrig Division lead.  The two teams met in a one-game playoff on May 2, with Columbia winning 4–2 to clinch a berth in the Championship Series.  The two teams face each other for the Ivy League championship for the third consecutive year.

Results
Game One

Game Two

Game Three

References

Ivy League Baseball Championship Series
Tournament